Dan Patrick Archibong (4 October 1943 – 11 March 1990) was a Nigerian soldier who was Military Governor of Cross River State from January 1984 until 1986.

Archibong was admitted to the Nigerian Defence Academy (NDA), Kaduna in January 1964. He did not complete the course with his original class because of the crisis of 1966.
He returned to the NDA after the war and was commissioned in August 1970, with loss of seniority.
Promoted to Colonel, Archibong was appointed Military Governor of Cross River State in January 1984 following the coup in which General Muhammadu Buhari took power, and held the position until 1986.

Promoted to Brigadier, Archibong was the Director of the Department of Joint Studies at the Armed Forces Command and Staff College, Jaji from 16 January 1988 to 1 January 1990.
He was principal staff officer to the Chief of General Staff when he died on 11 March 1990 in a car accident on the Lagos-Ibadan Expressway.
There were no witnesses and no other injuries, leading to rumors that his death was not accidental.
The Patrick Dan Archibong Barracks - Calabar was named after him, but later reverted to its location name.

References

Nigerian generals
1990 deaths
Nigerian military governors of Cross River State
Instructors at the Nigerian Armed Forces Command and Staff College
Road incident deaths in Nigeria
1943 births